Ayat-Ayat Cinta 2 (: Verses of Love 2) is the 2017 Indonesian religious drama film released on December 21, 2017, directed by Guntur Soehardjanto, who previously won nine awards at the 2005 Indonesian Film Festival through his work Juli di Bulan Juni. It is a sequel from Ayat-Ayat Cinta (2008). The plot follows Fahri, who has become a professor in Edinburgh, Scotland, and lives well but without Aisha, his wife who is missing for months when being a volunteer in the Gaza Strip. While waiting for news of his wife, he faces many problems from romance to distress for being a Muslim in Europe that is hit by Islamophobia.

The film received mixed and positive reviews from film critics and has been reached over 1 million tickets sold in five days upon release, and reached over 2.5 million in third weekend upon release. The film is crawling up to the fourth position of Indonesian best-selling films of 2017.

Plot
Fahri, now living in Edinburgh and working as a lecturer at the University Of Edinburgh, lives in a quiet neighborhood  together with Uncle and Hulusi, his Turkish household assistant.  Fahri has lost contact with Aisha, his wife, seven months ago, when Aisha started becoming a volunteer in the Gaza Strip. He recalls Aisha having had two miscarriages and finding herself restless till a friend’s invitation to help displaced children of Palestine created a renewed zest for life. He had given her his blessings to go to Palestine but due to reasons not shown at first, Aisha had stopped contacting him. Friends and relatives alike tell him that she is gone.

Fahri is still waiting for her sorrowly. He tries to overcome his sadness by busied himself as a lecturer and successful entrepreneur in the city. Fahri is also preoccupied with the presence of Misbah, his old friend, who want to stay with him.

Fahri is often confronted with the problems of his various neighbors. There is a Jewish grandmother, Catarina who is having problems with her stepson. There is also Keira McGills, a talented violinist who hates Fahri very much, considered him as terrorist who has caused the death of her father by a bomb in London.

Fahri tries to keep Aisha's trust to help people around. Fahri's good intentions often make misunderstanding and drag into more complicated issues and endanger his life. Fahri's life becomes more complicated when Hulya, Aisha's cousin, now grows up into a beautiful woman.

Hulya is cheerful and dynamic, showing her interest to Fahri. Hulya is willing to replace Aisha's role in Fahri's life. Fahri hesitates to open his heart to Hulya's presence because if he did it, it means he admits that Aisha is dead. Fahri is still hoping, every night, Aisha re-emerged in his life. All supported Fahri to continue his life with Hulya, including Sabina, a disabled faceless woman whom Fahri accommodated to stay with them. Sabina who has been considered as sister by Fahri, is not only help to take care of Fahri's house, but also able to make Fahri continue his life.

Cast
List of cast members obtained from IMDb.
 Fedi Nuril as Fahri bin Abdullah Shiddiq
 Tatjana Saphira as Hulya
 Chelsea Islan as Keira
 Dewi Sandra as Sabina/ Aisha
 Nur Fazura as Brenda
 Jihane Almira Chedid as Clara
 Pandji Pragiwaksono as Hulusi
 Bront Palarae as Baruch
 Dewi Irawan as Catarina
 Deborah Whyte as Janet
 Cole Gribble as Jason
 Arie K. Untung as Misbah
 Melayu Nicole Hall as Layla
 Nino Fernandez as Nicholas
 Millane Fernandez as Lynda
 Mathias Muchus as Paman "Fahri"
 Dian Nitami as Namira
 Syifa Hadju as Fatimah
 Paul Lapsley as the Police Officer

Production
The film is directed by Guntur Soehardjanto. Screenwriter by Alim Sudio and Ifan Ismail, the story in this movie again based on the story of the novel by Habiburrahman El Shirazy with the same title. Habiburrahman El Shirazy said that Ayat Ayat Cinta 2 is one of the most difficult novels he had written ever. The film was produced by Manoj Punjabi and Dhamoo Punjabi. The actor Fedi Nuril was asked again to play as Fahri, the lead actor in this film. The film is also starring Tatjana Saphira, Chelsea Islan, Dewi Sandra, Nur Fazura, Pandji Pragiwaksono and Arie Untung.

The reading process began in April. The filming process began on August 5, 2017 and took up to fifty days. The film was set in various places such as Gaza, Scotland, London, Budapest, and Jakarta. In an interview, producer Manoj did not mention the details of budget but he claimed this project is the biggest so far beyond the previous film, Surga Yang Tak Dirindukan 2 which previously claimed to spend Rp16 billion just for the production.

Original soundtrack 
The soundtrack album was released on December 4, 2017. The album was sung by various musicians from Indonesia such as Krisdayanti, Rossa, Raisa, Isyana, and many more.

Accolades

References

External links
 Official site
 

2017 drama films
2017 films
Films based on Indonesian novels
Films shot in Edinburgh
Indonesian drama films
2010s Indonesian-language films
Indonesian sequel films